Insulin glargine, sold under the brand name Lantus among others, is a long-acting modified form of medical insulin, used in the management of type I and type II diabetes. It is typically the recommended long acting insulin in the United Kingdom. It is injected just under the skin. Effects generally begin an hour after use.

Common side effects include low blood sugar, problems at the site of injection, itchiness, and weight gain. Other serious side effects include low blood potassium. NPH insulin rather than insulin glargine is generally preferred in pregnancy. After injection microcrystals slowly release insulin for about 24 hours. This insulin causes body tissues to absorb glucose from the blood and decreases glucose production by the liver.

Insulin glargine was approved for medical use in the United States in 2000. It is on the World Health Organization's List of Essential Medicines. In 2020, it was the 32nd most commonly prescribed medication in the United States with more than 17million prescriptions. In July 2021, the US Food and Drug Administration (FDA) approved an interchangeable biosimilar insulin product called Semglee (insulin glargine-yfgn) for the treatment of diabetes.

Medical uses

The long-acting insulin class, which includes insulin glargine, do not appear much better than neutral protamine Hagedorn (NPH) insulin, but do have a greater cost, making them, as of 2010, not cost effective for the treatment of type 2 diabetes. In a previous review it was unclear if there is a difference in hypoglycemia, as there was not enough data to determine any differences with respect to long term outcomes, however a more recent Cochrane systematic review did not find clinically significant difference when comparing insulin glargine to NHP insulin, insulin detemir or insulin degludec in the management of type I Diabetes in neither adults or children in periods of 6 months or longer. It is not typically the recommended long acting insulin in the United Kingdom.

Semglee is indicated to improve glycemic control in adults and children with Type 1 diabetes and in adults with Type 2 diabetes. Semglee is both biosimilar to, and interchangeable with (can be substituted for), its reference product Lantus (insulin glargine), a long-acting insulin analog.

Mixing with other insulins
Unlike some other longer-acting insulins, glargine must not be diluted or mixed with other insulin or solution in the same syringe. However, this restriction has been questioned.

Adverse effects
Common side effects include low blood sugar, problems at the site of injection, itchiness, and weight gain. Serious side effects include low blood potassium.

As of 2012, tentative evidence shows no association between insulin glargine and cancer. Previous studies had raised concerns.

When comparing insulin glargine to NPH insulin, insulin detemir or insulin degludec, no significant adverse effects were found in the management of type I Diabetes in neither adults or children in periods of 6 months or longer.

Pharmacology

Mechanism of action
Insulin glargine differs from human insulin by replacing asparagine with glycine in position 21 of the A-chain and by carboxy-terminal extension of B-chain by 2 arginine residues.  The arginine amino acids shift the isoelectric point from a pH of 5.4 to 6.7, making the molecule more soluble at an acidic pH and less soluble at physiological pH. The isoelectric shift also allows for the subcutaneous injection of a clear solution. The glycine substitution prevents deamidation of the acid-sensitive asparagine at acidic pH. In the neutral subcutaneous space, higher-order aggregates form, resulting in a slow, peakless dissolution and absorption of insulin from the site of injection. It can achieve a peakless level for at least 24 hours.

Acceptance and repartition in the body

Insulin glargine is formulated at an acidic pH 4, where it is completely water-soluble. After subcutaneous injection of the acidic solute (which can cause discomfort and a stinging sensation), when a physiologic pH (approximately 7.4) is achieved the increase in pH causes the insulin to come out of solution resulting in the formation of higher order aggregates of insulin hexamers. The higher order aggregation slows the dissociation of the hexamers into insulin monomers, the functional and physiologically active unit of insulin. This gradual process ensures that small amounts of insulin glargine are released into the body continuously, giving an almost peakless profile.

History
On 9 June 2000, the European Commission formally approved the launching of Lantus by Sanofi-Aventis Germany Ltd. in the entire European Union. The admission was prolonged on 9 June 2005.

A three-fold more concentrated formulation, brand name Toujeo, was introduced after FDA approval in 2015.

Society and culture

Legal status

Biosimilars 
Abasaglar was approved for medical use in the European Union in September 2014.

Lusduna was approved for medical use in the European Union in January 2017.

In March 2018, insulin glargine (Semglee) was approved for medical use in the European Union.

In July 2021, insulin glargine-yfgn (Semglee) was approved for medical use in the United States as the first interchangeable biosimilar of Lantus. The FDA granted approval of Semglee to Mylan Pharmaceuticals Inc.

Patent expiry 
Patent protection for insulin glargine expired in most countries in 2015 and in the U.S.A. is expected to expire on 2027-07-05. Insulin glargine from competitor Eli Lilly became available in most countries during 2015, under the brand names Basaglar (as a follow-on in the US) and Abasaglar (as a biosimilar in the EU).

References

External links 
 

Insulin receptor agonists
Insulin therapies
Human proteins
Recombinant proteins
Peptide hormones
Wikipedia medicine articles ready to translate
Eli Lilly and Company brands
Boehringer Ingelheim
Sanofi
World Health Organization essential medicines